Under traffic violations reciprocity agreements, non-resident drivers are treated like residents when they are stopped for a traffic offense that occurs in another jurisdiction. They also ensure that punishments such as penalty points on one's license and the ensuing increase in insurance premiums follow the driver home. The general principle of such interstate, interprovincial, and/or international compacts is to guarantee the rule "one license, one record."

Australia
 The Australian States and Territories have all passed legislation regarding the recognition of demerit points and licence suspensions in other states/territories.

Canada
Canadian Driver License Compact which is similar to the US Driver License Compact.
Driver License Agreement

European Union
The EU is working on conventions for the mutual recognition and enforcement of penalties for road traffic offences and driver disqualifications by the jurisdictions of member countries.

France
France has an agreement with Spain and Switzerland for recognition of licence points and suspension and is working on agreements with other countries, especially the UK.

United Kingdom
One driver registration system applies to both England and Wales and Scotland; driving disqualifications and penalty points apply immediately in both jurisdictions. There is mutual recognition of driving disqualifications with Northern Ireland and the Republic of Ireland.1

Mexico
Driver License Agreement

Northern Ireland
The driver registration system of Northern Ireland has mutual recognition of driving disqualifications with the system in Great Britain and the Republic of Ireland.2

Ireland
The Republic of Ireland has mutual recognition of driving disqualifications with Great Britain and Northern Ireland.3

United States
Driver License Compact concerns records being recorded at home.
Non-Resident Violator Compact concerns the non-compliance with an out-of-state traffic citation.
Driver License Agreement, a new compact which combines the Driver License Compact and Non-Resident Violator Compact and includes Canada and Mexico.

References

1. "Driving disqualification: agreements between Great Britain and other countries," Directgov (http://www.direct.gov.uk/en/Motoring/DriverLicensing/DrivingInGbOnAForeignLicence/DG_185285).

2. "Disqualified drivers targeted in international agreement," Northern Ireland Executive (http://www.northernireland.gov.uk/index/media-centre/news-departments/news-doe/news-doe-june-2008/news-doe-260608-disqualified-drivers-targeted.htm).

3. "Driving offences," Citizens Information Board (Republic of Ireland) (http://www.citizensinformation.ie/en/travel_and_recreation/motoring_1/driving_offences/driving_offences.html).

Traffic law